G. Ramachandran (known by Friends and Family as "Rama") is a former president of the Singapore Indian Chamber of Commerce and Industry (SICCI). He was the President during the years 1966–1968, 1973–1974, 1982–1984, 1985–1986, and was its youngest president.
   
He was born in Singapore on 23 May 1931, and died on 6 March 2018.  He is the first son of P. Govindasamy Pillai (PGP). PGP was born in 1887, in Mayavaram, Tamil Nadu, India. P. Govindasamy Pillai set up a string of PGP stores in Singapore and Malaya. He was a noted philanthropist, the biggest donor to Perumal Temple, founder-member of the Indian Chamber of Commerce and founder of the Ramakrishna Mission.

After the Second World War, G. Ramachandran studied at Victoria School from 1947 to 1949.

After his father died in 1980, G. Ramachandran took over the family business. Like his father, he was a well-known and popular leader of the Indian community in Singapore.

External links

Singaporean people of Tamil descent
Singaporean businesspeople
Singaporean people of Indian descent
Victoria School, Singapore alumni
1937 births
Living people
Singaporean Hindus